is a badminton player from Ashikita, Kumamoto, Japan and plays for the Renesas badminton club. Mizuki Fujii concentrates on doubles badminton. Most of her success has come with women's doubles partner Reika Kakiiwa. Together they reached the final of the 2010 Korea Open Super Series, their first major final as a pair. She also assisted her team in winning the bronze medal at the 2010 Uber Cup. In the mixed doubles she pairs with Hirokatsu Hashimoto. Her career highest achievement was the silver medal in the women's doubles at the 2012 London Summer Olympics with Kakiiwa. She retired from professional badminton after the win at London.

Achievements

Olympic Games 
Women's doubles

Asian Junior Championships 
Girls' doubles

BWF Superseries 
The BWF Superseries, launched on 14 December 2006 and implemented in 2007, is a series of elite badminton tournaments, sanctioned by Badminton World Federation (BWF). BWF Superseries has two level such as Superseries and Superseries Premier. A season of Superseries features twelve tournaments around the world, which introduced since 2011, with successful players invited to the Superseries Finals held at the year end.

Women's doubles

  BWF Superseries Finals tournament
  BWF Superseries Premier tournament
  BWF Superseries tournament

BWF Grand Prix 
The BWF Grand Prix has two levels: Grand Prix and Grand Prix Gold. It is a series of badminton tournaments, sanctioned by Badminton World Federation (BWF) since 2007.

Women's doubles

Mixed doubles

  BWF Grand Prix Gold tournament
  BWF Grand Prix tournament

BWF International Challenge/Series 
Women's singles

Women's doubles

Mixed doubles

  BWF International Challenge tournament
  BWF International Series tournament

Record against selected opponents 
Women's doubles results with Reika Kakiiwa against Super Series finalists, Worlds Semi-finalists, and Olympic quarterfinalists.

  Leanne Choo & Renuga Veeran 2–0
 / Petya Nedelcheva & Anastasia Russkikh 1–0
  Alex Bruce & Michelle Li 1–0
  Du Jing & Yu Yang 0–1
  Xia Huan & Tang Jinhua 1–2
  Cheng Shu & Zhao Yunlei 0–4
  Wang Xiaoli & Yu Yang 0–4
  Bao Yixin & Zhong Qianxin 0–4
  Tian Qing & Zhao Yunlei 1–3
  Cheng Wen-hsing & Chien Yu-chin 2–4
  Christinna Pedersen & Kamilla Rytter Juhl 2–3
  Poon Lok Yan & Tse Ying Suet 4–0
  Jwala Gutta & Ashwini Ponnappa 3–1
  Vita Marissa & Nadya Melati 1–2
  Miyuki Maeda & Satoko Suetsuna 0–2
  Shizuka Matsuo & Mami Naito 4–3
  Ha Jung-eun & Kim Min-jung 3–3
  Jung Kyung-eun & Kim Ha-na 1–3
  Chin Eei Hui & Wong Pei Tty 4–2
  Valeria Sorokina & Nina Vislova 4–2
  Jiang Yanmei & Li Yujia 0–1
  Shinta Mulia Sari & Yao Lei 3–1
  Duanganong Aroonkesorn & Kunchala Voravichitchaikul 2–1

References 

Japanese female badminton players
1988 births
Living people
Sportspeople from Kumamoto Prefecture
Badminton players at the 2012 Summer Olympics
Olympic badminton players of Japan
Olympic silver medalists for Japan
Olympic medalists in badminton
Medalists at the 2012 Summer Olympics
Badminton players at the 2010 Asian Games
Asian Games competitors for Japan